Radovi na cesti is the tenth studio album by Bosnian rock band Zabranjeno Pušenje, released through Tropik distribution in Bosnia and Herzegovina, Croatia Records in Croatia and Dallas Records in Serbia, on October 10, 2013. Also, the album has been available on free digital download since its release.

Promotion 
A music video for "Boško i Admira" was filmed with Žare Batinović as the director and the writer and was released on their YouTube channel on April 6, 2013.

On October 2, 2013, the band released the second single called "Ti voliš sapunice" on their YouTube channel. The video is directed by Žare Batinović was filmed in Sarajevo from August 31, to September 1, 2013. Sejo Sexon is cast as a lead male role, while Nikolina Jelisavac is a lead female role.

On May 27, 2015, they released video for the song "Tri kile, tri godine" on their YouTube channel. On Jun 20, 2016, the band published the fifth video of the album on their YouTube channel. It is for the song "Klasa optimist". The video for the song "Kafana kod Keke" is published on January 26, 2017.

Critical reception 

Radovi na cesti has received favourable reviews from critics. Petar Kostić of the balkanrock.com gave the album a positive review stating that "the product of talent, prowess and uncompromising must be quality".

Track listing
Source: Discogs

Personnel 
Credits adapted from the album's liner notes.

Zabranjeno Pušenje
Sejo Sexon – lead vocals, guitar, backing vocals
Toni Lović – electric guitar, acoustic guitar
Branko Trajkov Trak – drums, percussion, acoustic guitar, backing vocals
Robert Boldižar – violin, keyboards, backing vocals
Paul Kempf – keyboards 
Dejan Orešković Klo – bass

Additional musicians
Ante Prgin Surka – backing vocals (track 2), trumpet (tracks 2, 3)
Romeo Krželj Roki – backing vocals (track 5)
Nenad Borić – drums 

Production
 Sejo Sexon – production
 Toni Lović – sound engineering, programing, audio mixing, production (Studio Plavi Film in Zagreb, Croatia)
 John Davis – mastering (Metropolis Mastering in London, UK)
 Dario Vitez – executive production

Design
Anur Hadžiomerspahić – design and layout (Ideologija Creative Agency in Sarajevo, BIH)
Saša Midžor Sučić – photos

References

2013 albums
Zabranjeno Pušenje albums